Venstre ('left') is the name of two Scandinavian liberal political parties:

Venstre (Denmark)
Venstre (Norway)

See also
Moderate Venstre
Radikale Venstre